Jérôme Guézénec (born 23 December 1973) is a French retired para table tennis player who competed at international table tennis competitions. He is a World champion and a two-time European silver medalist.

References

External links
 
 

1973 births
Living people
Paralympic table tennis players of France
Table tennis players at the 2012 Summer Paralympics
French male table tennis players
20th-century French people
21st-century French people